This is a list of memorials to James Madison, the fourth president of the United States.

Artworks
 Statue of James Madison, 1976

Buildings
James Madison Memorial Building, part of the Library of Congress
Madison Square Garden

Cities, towns, or villages

Madison, Connecticut
Madison, Georgia
 Madison, Maine
 Madison, Mississippi
 Madison, Missouri
 Madison, New Hampshire
 Madison, New Jersey
 Madison, Pennsylvania
 Madison, Wisconsin, the capital of Wisconsin
 Madison Lake, Minnesota

Counties

 Madison County, Alabama
 Madison County, Arkansas
 Madison County, Florida
 Madison County, Georgia
 Madison County, Idaho
 Madison County, Illinois
 Madison County, Indiana
 Madison County, Iowa
 Madison County, Kentucky
 Madison County, Mississippi
 Madison County, Missouri 
 Madison County, Montana
 Madison County, New York
 Madison County, North Carolina
 Madison County, Ohio
 Madison County, Tennessee
 Madison County, Texas
 Madison County, Virginia
 Madison Parish, Louisiana

Educational institutions
 James Madison College at Michigan State University
 James Madison High School
 James Madison Middle School
 James Madison University
 James Madison High School (Portland, Oregon)

Topographical features
Madison Range
Madison River
Mount Madison

Military structures
Fort Madison, stockade fort used during the Creek War
Fort Madison, fort used during the War of 1812. Subsequent community that grew around the fort came to be called Fort Madison.
Fort Madison, Nuku Hiva, first United States naval base in the Pacific Ocean

Military vessels
USS James Madison (1807) was commissioned in 1807. 
USS Madison (1812) was a 14-gun schooner launched in 1812.
USS Madison (1832) was a Van Buren-class schooner, designed by Edward Preble and built in 1832.
USS James Madison (SSBN-627), in commission 1963–1992.

Parks and public spaces
Madison Square in New York City
Madison Square in Savannah, Georgia

Streets
Madison Avenue in New York City
Madison Avenue in North Belfast, United Kingdom

Other
James Madison Institute
James Madison Memorial Fellowship Foundation

See also
Madison Township (disambiguation)
Presidential memorials in the United States

Madison, James place names
Madison